Clearance Giddens is an African American Elvis impersonator from Melfa, Virginia, who has been billed as the "Black Elvis". He has appeared on The Arsenio Hall Show and the Geraldo Show, and in the film Honeymoon in Vegas. In the early 1990s, he also sang on stage in a duet with Jimmy Buffett singing "Jailhouse Rock". He is listed in the book I Am Elvis: A Guide to Elvis Impersonators.

Personal background
Giddens is a house painter by trade and had worked as a painter for Crutchley Enterprises in Virginia for years. Some sources say he comes from Melfa, Virginia, but he actually grew up in Painter, Virginia which is a small town in Accomack County. He comes from a devoutly religious family. He grew up being raised by his parents, with his mother being an old fashioned type of God fearing Christian. His first guitar came from his mother. After he left school and to help support his family, he found work in the local fields.

When Giddens began his Elvis act, and there was opposition in his family, especially from his mother because of it being too worldly in her view.

Career
During the course of his career, he has appeared on shows such as The Arsenio Hall Show, Hard Copy, Inside Edition,  Entertainment Tonight, the Geraldo Show, and Howard Stern.

Early years
His early influences are Elvis Presley, James Brown, Roy C, country and gospel music. As a child, he saw Presley on black & white television and with Presley moving and singing the way he did, Giddens couldn't believe what he saw. he had never seen a white guy move like that before.
 His mother was a strict Christian and Giddens recalled having to hide in the closet while listening to some of Presley's more racey lyrics.

Before Giddens started his Elvis act, he was a member of a gospel group called the Gospel Specials who sang with artists such as Al Green and Solomon Burke. He is also credited as guitarist as well lead vocalist on two tracks by a group called Gospel Expressions who released an album, Good Times Bad Times. After the gospel group broke up, his girlfriend at the time who was an Elvis fan gave him some encouragement. She liked hearing Giddens sing "Love Me Tender".

His Elvis impersonating career came about in 1988 when at a dinner, a friend suggested he try doing an Elvis act at a diner in Onancock. What came about as a result, was him turning into a kind of phenomenon.

1990s
He started to get serious about it in the early 1990s and started out with a Philadelphia-based backing band called The Flamin' Caucasians. He started getting bookings in Virginia Beach and then an article about him in Spin Magazine brought him national attention. In 1992, he appeared in the film Honeymoon in Vegas that starred James Caan, Nicolas Cage and Sarah Jessica Parker. He played the part of Black Elvis. Giddens was surprised with his rise to fame.  
Like another African American Elvis impersonator Robert Washington, Giddens did quite well in appearances. He played the Elvis Impersonator circuit along the East Coast and made a living from it. At one stage, his backup band was called The White Trash Band. 
In June 1995, Giddens appeared at the Viva Elvis weekend. Giddens took to the stage, beginning his show with "Whole Lotta Shakin' Goin On".

Not long after Giddens's rise to fame he discovered he was about to be a father again and was left with the choice of going out on the road or being a father so he chose the latter.

Reaction
During the early 1990s when Giddens appeared on the Geraldo Show there were some mixed reactions. One member of the audience who happened to be black, verbally criticized Giddens for betraying his race by imitating a white entertainer. He said to Giddens that it was very disrespectful to them, meaning African Americans that he wasn't representing them by being someone he couldn't be. A white woman in the audience yelled out that Giddens has her vote and commended his performance and as a Black Elvis, she liked him. She also mentioned that Elvis dealt with a lot of black people. A white Elvis impersonator Russ Howe shook the hand of Giddens and said what he was doing was beautiful which was met by applause from the audience.

2000s
On March 29, 2008, he was booked to appear at Quizzo Bowl IV, held at the Blue Horizon on 1314 North Broad Street, Philadelphia.

In December, 2014, Giddens and backing group, billed Black Elvis and Snowflake appeared at a Christmas Party and Toy Drive at Little Italy, Nassawadox, Virginia.

As of 2018, Giddens was making appearances at the Do Drop Inn restaurant and lounge in Franktown, Virginia.

Recent activity
In late 2018, Giddens was one of a group of Elvis impersonators that were featured in Apple's Group Facetime Service commercial.

Discography

Filmography

Stage

References

Links
 Delmarva Now: Va. Shore icon Black Elvis has 'one more tour left'
 Youtube: "BLACK ELVIS" The KIng is back... and he's black. 1996 WBFF TV
 The Free Lance Star September 22, 1994 article

Elvis impersonators
Singers from Virginia
African-American male singers
American male singers
People from Accomack County, Virginia